The girls' 100 metre breaststroke event at the 2018 Summer Youth Olympics took place on 9 and 10 October at the Natatorium in Buenos Aires, Argentina.

Results

Heats
The heats were started on 9 October at 10:41.

Semifinals
The semifinals were started on 9 October at 18:51.

Final

The final was held on 10 October at 18:39.

References

Swimming at the 2018 Summer Youth Olympics